Karl Gatermann may refer to:

 Karl Gatermann the Elder (1883–1959), German painter
 Karl Gatermann the Younger (1909–1992), German painter